Eucalyptus seeana, or narrow-leaved red gum, is a species of small to medium-sized tree that is endemic to eastern Australia. It has smooth bark, lance-shaped adult leaves, flower buds in groups of between seven and eleven, white flowers and hemispherical fruit.

Description
Flowering has been observed in November and December and the flowers are white.

Taxonomy and naming
Eucalyptus seeana was first formally described in 1904 by Joseph Maiden in the Proceedings of the Linnean Society of New South Wales. The specific epithet honours John See.

Distribution and habitat
The narrow-leaved red gum mostly grows as scattered individuals in forest and occurs from near Caloundra in Queensland to near Telegraph Point in New South Wales.

Conservation status
The population of this species in the Taree LGA is listed as an "endangered population" and is threatened by habitat fragmentation, weed invasion and forestry activities. In Queensland it is classified as "least concern" under the Nature Conservation Act 1992.

References

seeana
Myrtales of Australia
Flora of New South Wales
Flora of Queensland
Trees of Australia
Plants described in 1904